Together Forever may refer to:

Film and television
 Together Forever (film), a 1987 LDS Church film
 Together Forever (TV series), a 2012 Philippine romance comedy-drama television series broadcast by GMA Network
 "Together Forever" (Degrassi: The Next Generation), an episode of Degrassi: The Next Generation

Music
 "Together Forever" (Rick Astley song)
 Together Forever (Lisette Melendez album)
 "Together Forever" (Lisette Melendez song)
 "Together Forever" (Dolly Parton song), a song from the 2017 album I Believe in You
 Together Forever (The Marshall Tucker Band album)
 Together Forever: Greatest Hits 1983–1991, an album by Run-D.M.C.
 Together Forever – Greatest Hits and More..., an album by Rick Astley
 "Together Forever", a song by Rab Noakes on the album Fog on the Tyne
 "Together Forever", a song written by Harvey Schmidt and Tom Jones, from the musical I Do! I Do! (musical)
 "Together Forever", a song from the Pokémon TV series soundtrack Pokémon 2.B.A. Master
 "Together Forever", a song from the Sesame Street film The Adventures of Elmo in Grouchland
 "Together Forever", a song from the Disney Channel TV series The Ghost and Molly McGee

Other
 Together Forever (horse), an Irish Thoroughbred racehorse
 Together Forever (Disney), Disneyland spectacular

See also
 Forever Together (disambiguation)
 Together (disambiguation)